Jaroslava Maxová (born 6 April 1957; Jaroslava Horská, Jaroslava Horská-Maxová) is a Czech mezzo-soprano opera singer and vocal coach.

Biography 
Jaroslava Maxová was born on 6 April 1957 in Moravská Třebová, Moravia and studied singing at the Bratislava Academy in Slovakia. She made her Slovak National Opera début already during her studies and became a soloist there in 1986. She sang principal roles throughout the next eight years and since 1994 continued to do so at the Prague National Opera Theatre.

Her repertoire includes Strauss‘ Octavian in Der Rosenkavalier, Offenbach’s Niklausse in Les contes d’Hoffmann, Verdi’s Amneris in Aida, Fenena in Nabucco, Maddalena in Rigoletto, Preziosilla in La forza del destino, Mozart’s Dorabella in Così fan tutte, Cherubino and Marcellina in Le nozze di Figaro and Sesto in La clemenza di Tito, Rossini’s Berta in Il barbiere di Siviglia, Tchaikovsky’s Olga in Eugene Onegin, Bizet’s Mercedes in Carmen, Mascagni‘s Lola in Cavalleria rusticana, Martinů’s Filoména in Alexander Twice, Gluck’s Orpheus in Orpheus and Eurydice, Dvořák’s Witch in Rusalka and Kate in The Devil and Kate, Smetana’s Radmila in Libuše and Háta in The Bartered Bride, Handel’s Ulysses in Deidamia, Purcell’s Witch in Dido and Aeneas, Britten’s Miss Jessel in The Turn of the Screw, Janáček’s Varvara in Káťa Kabanová, Kedruta in The Excursions of Mr Brouček and Pastuchyňa (Herdswoman) in Jenůfa.

Discography 
1986 Wolfgang Amadeus Mozart: Requiem [Zdeněk Košler, conductor] [CD]. Czechoslovakia: Opus
1989 Perosi, Lorenzo: Stabat Mater, Dies Iste, L'Inno della Pace. [Arturo Sacchetti, conductor] [CD]. Vaticano, Italy: Frequenz
1997 Zandonai, Riccardo: Francesca da Rimini. [Fabio Luisi, conductor] [CD]. Vienna, Austria: KOCH International
1997 Donizetti, Gaetano: Messa da Requiem. [Alexander Rahbari, conductor] [CD]. Vienna, Austria: KOCH International
2002 Klusák, Jan: Zpráva pro akademii, Bertram a Mescalinda. [Přemysl Charvát, conductor] [CD]. Prague, Czech Republic: National theatre.
2005 Wagner, Richard: Der Ring des Nibelungen [John Fiore, conductor] [CD]. Prague, Czech Republic: National theatre
2009 Goldscheider, Alexander: The Song of Songs. [CD]. London, United Kingdom: Romantic Robot

Collaboration with composers
Peter Maxwell Davies
Jan Klusák
Alexander Goldscheider
Alexander Rudajev

Sources 
Theatre Institute; Jaroslava Maxova (in English, p. 44)
National Theatre; archive; Jaroslava Maxova (in Czech)
Czech singers; Jaroslava Maxova (in Czech)
Muzikus; Jaroslava Maxova (in Czech)
The Free Library; Report on the condition of opera in the Czech Republic; Jaroslava Maxova (in English)
MusicWeb; CD REVIEW ; Jaroslava Maxova (in English)

Literature
Janota, Dalibor; Kučera, Jan P. Malá encyklopedie české opery. Prague (Czech Republic), Litomyšl (Czech Republic): Paseka, 1999. 
Poledňák, Ivan. Vášeň rozumu. Olomouc (Czech Republic): Univerzita Palackého, 2004.

External links 
Jaroslava Maxova's Website

Romantic Robot
The Song of Songs (Alexander Goldscheider) on Last.fm

1957 births
Living people
Czech educators
Voice teachers
21st-century Czech women opera singers
20th-century Czech women opera singers
Operatic mezzo-sopranos
People from Moravská Třebová
Palacký University Olomouc alumni
Women music educators